Quakers is the debut studio album by Quakers, a hip hop supergroup consisting of producers Fuzzface (Geoff Barrow), 7-Stu-7, and Katalyst. It was released on Stones Throw Records on 26 March 2012. The CD edition comes with a full instrumental version as a bonus disc.

Critical reception

At Metacritic, which assigns a weighted average score out of 100 to reviews from mainstream critics, the album received an average score of 80, based on 14 reviews, indicating "generally favorable reviews".

Chase McMullen of Beats Per Minute wrote: "As both a display of production mastery, and as a hip hop effort, Quakers is one of the most consistently refreshing albums in recent memory." Heather Phares of AllMusic commented that "since there's so much talent involved and the tracks are so short (Estee Nack's meditative 'Lost and Found' is the longest at just over four minutes), the bright spots come at listeners thick and fast." She added, "Quakers is the kind of album where favorite tracks change from listen to listen, and a testament to hip-hop's enduring power."

Track listing

References

External links
 

2012 debut albums
Quakers (band) albums
Stones Throw Records albums
Albums produced by Geoff Barrow